Ta' Kola Windmill, is a windmill in the village of Xagħra, on the island of Gozo in the Maltese archipelago. It was built in 1725 by the Fondazione Vilhena of Grand Master Manoel de Vilhena, and was rebuilt in the 1780s. It became a museum in 1992.

Like many other Maltese windmills, it has a round central tower surrounded by a number of rooms. The sails and milling machinery have been restored, as have the miller's living-quarters. The museum also contains a large collection of traditional tools, mostly for wood- and iron-working.

References

Archaeological museums
Ethnographic museums in Europe
Museums in Malta
Tower mills
Xagħra
Windmills in Malta
National Inventory of the Cultural Property of the Maltese Islands
Sites managed by Heritage Malta